Dharan a sub-metropolitan city in Sunsari District of Province No. 1, Nepal, which was established as a fourth municipality in the Kingdom in 1958. It is the third most populous city in Eastern Nepal after Biratnagar and Itahari. The Nepali word "dharan" means a saw pit.  The rainforest from which the tree trunks came is still just on the edge of the city.  Dharan is the location of the former Vijayapur, the seat of a historical Limbuwan kingdom, which was later used by the Sen kings of Makwanpur.   
 Much later the British Gurkha camp opened in October 1960.    The use of the camp by British Gurkhas finished in the mid 1990s.    Dharan has an estimated city population of 173,096 living in 34,834 households as per 2021 Nepal census. It is one of the cities of the Greater Birat Development Area which incorporates the cities of Biratnagar-Itahari-Gothgau-Biratchowk-Dharan primarily located on the Koshi Highway in Eastern Nepal, with an estimated total urban agglomerated population of 804,300 people living in 159,332 households. It is the  largest city in the province number one by Area. It covers 192.32 square kilometers while Biratnagar and Itahari is 2nd and 3rd biggest cities by Area

Geography 
Dharan is situated on the foothills of the Mahabharat Range in the north with its southern tip touching the edge of the Terai region at an altitude of 1148 ft (349m).  Dharan bazaar grew up near Phusre where the old walking route to Dhankuta and a large part of the Eastern hills left the plains with the ascent of Sanghuri Danra.  In the days when villagers in the hills made their annual trek to sell and buy goods this was a natural location for a market where hills and Terai met.  In 1952 the construction of the Kosi barrage began and a narrow gauge railway was built to take stone from Phusre loaded at a locality now known as "Railway" to the site of the barrage near the Indian Border.   The Koshi highway runs through the heart of the city thus connecting it with the provincial capital of Biratnagar as well as the Itahari junction of the east–west Mahendra highway (lying 41 km and 17 km south, respectively), and the Nepal-China border of Kimathanka (lying 115 km north).  The road from Biratnagar was originally built and surfaced in connection with the building of Gopher Camp for the British Gurkhas.  The road from Dharan to Dhankuta was financed by the UK and largely completed by 1982.

Demographics

Languages 

At the time of the 2011 Census of Nepal, 42.5% of the population in the city spoke Nepali, 10.1% Limbu, 7.4% Newar, 5.9% Rai, 5.9% Tamang, 5.8% Bantawa, and 22.4% spoke other smaller languages as their first language.

Caste And Ethnic groups 

The largest single caste/ethnic in Dharan is Rai People|Rai, who makes (20.7%) of the population, Limbu comes to second with (11.7%), Newar makes (11.1%) of population Chhetri (10.7%), Tamang (7.3%), Hill Brahmin (7.1%), Kami (6.2%) and other various ethnic groups makes (25.2%) Of the population.

Environment 
A study conducted in 2016 to analyze the bacteriological quality of bottled drinking water and that of municipal tap water in Dharan found that one hundred percent of the tap water samples and 87.5% of the bottled water samples were contaminated with heterotrophic bacteria. Of the tap water samples, 55.3% were positive for total coliforms, compared with 25% of the bottled water, but no bottled water samples were positive for fecal coliforms and fecal streptococci, in contrast to 21.1% and 14.5% of the tap water samples being contaminated with fecal coliforms and fecal streptococci, respectively. One hundred percent of the tap water samples and 54.2% of the bottled water samples had pH in the acceptable range.

Tourist attractions 

 Budha Subba: As an important and unique religious site to Nepali Hindus, this temple holds immense cultural significance to the people of Dharan. Budha Subba temple is located a top the Bijaypur hills and the surrounding area is highly scenic. This temple holds historic significance because it is the tomb of the last Limbu King, Buddhi Karnaraya Khebang.
 Gurkha Memorial Park: This park was established "to preserve the legacy of Brigade of Gurkhas in Dharan for posterity before it is forgotten and lost forever", as many Nepalese men, many of whom were residents of Dharan, joined the Brigade of Gurkhas.   
 Dharan Clock Tower

Media and communication
Newspapers: The people of Dharan are served by several daily local newspapers and national newspapers. There are 11 local newspapers in total. These include The Blast Times and The Morning Times. National newspapers are also provided to the people of Dharan on a daily basis. National newspapers include The Kathmandu Post, Kantipur, Annapurna Post, and Himalayan Times. Several monthly neighborhood papers serve the town.
Radio: The state-owned Radio Nepal is broadcast on the medium wave on 648 kHz in the city. Five private local FM stations are available. They are Star FM - 95.6 MHz, Vijayapur FM - 98.8 MHz, Dantakali FM - 88.5 MHz, and Radio Dharan FM - 88.8 MHz. Radio Ganatantra FM 95.1 MHz is a community radio station. Likewise, Dharan has a BFBS Radio Relay station. It broadcasts on FM frequencies.
Television: Nepal's state-owned television broadcaster, Nepal Television's relay station is present near its border, which provides two free-to-air terrestrial channels. A mix of Nepali, Hindi, English, and other international channels are accessible via cable subscription and direct-broadcast satellite services. Dharan Cable Network broadcasts Kriti Television Channel as a local television channel that covers events in the city.

Climate

Notable people
 Bhola Rijal, Doctor and lyricist
 Deep Shrestha, Singer and music composer
 Deepak Limbu, Singer
 Dhiraj Rai, Singer
 Govinda Subba,  First governor of province no. 1 (Nepal)
 Hari Nath Bastola, Politician
 Harka Raj Rai, Current mayor of Dharan, social activist, and leader of public mobilization movement.
 Krishna Kumar Rai, Politician 
 Malina Joshi, Miss Nepal 2011
 Malvika Subba, Miss Nepal 2002
 Minendra Rijal, Politician & MP
 Namrata Shrestha, Actress
 Raju Kaji Shakya, Former captain of national football team
 Sabin Rai, Singer
 Subin Limbu, Miss Nepal 2014

See also
 List of educational institutions in Dharan
 2022 Dharan municipal election

References

Populated places in Sunsari District
Sunsari District
Municipalities in Koshi Province
Nepal municipalities established in 1962
Submetropolitan municipalities of Nepal
Municipalities in Sunsari District